Fringe is an American drama series that aired on Fox from September 9, 2008 to January 18, 2013. It has been nominated for a variety of different awards including an Emmy, five Saturn Awards, six Golden Reel Awards, two Satellite Awards, and two Writers Guild of America Awards.

The Fringe series follows an FBI Fringe Division team based in Boston, Massachusetts.  The team uses unorthodox "fringe" science and FBI investigative techniques to investigate "the Pattern", a series of unexplained and often ghastly occurrences taking place all over the world. Joshua Jackson and Jasika Nicole have both garnered nominations for their starring and co-starring roles as well. Leonard Nimoy has even claimed a Saturn Award, for his guest stint on the show. "Pilot" is the most nominated single episode of the series, receiving nominations in five different awards ceremonies, six nominations total. The episode garnered the series' only non-acting award, a VES award, and was nominated for the series' first Emmy. "Unleashed" is the episode with the second greatest appraisal, reaping double nominations during the 2010 Golden Reel Ceremony. However, White Tulip has also been critically acclaimed and appraised, receiving a Creative Arts Emmy nomination following the conclusion of Fringe's second season. As of June 2009, Fringe has been honored three times and nominated for over thirty awards in thirteen different ceremonies, winning only seven.

Emmy Awards
The Primetime Emmy Awards are presented annually by the Academy of Television Arts & Sciences.

Technical awards are presented annually the day before the Primetime Emmy Award event is held. They are called the Creative Arts Emmy Awards. In 2009, Fringe has been nominated for two awards, honoring its special effects.

Creative Arts Emmy Awards

Golden Reel Awards
The Golden Reel Awards are presented annually by the Motion Picture Sound Editors. Fringe has been nominated six times at this ceremony, and has yet to claim a single prize.

Satellite Awards

The Satellite Awards, formerly known as the Golden Satellite Awards, are presented both for cinema and television. Fringe has been nominated twice for John Noble's portrayal of Doctor Walter Bishop

Saturn Awards
The Saturn Awards are presented by the Academy of Science Fiction, Fantasy & Horror Films and honor science fiction and fantasy films and television shows. For work on the first season, Fringe was nominated for two Saturn Awards, one for Best Network Television Series and another for Anna Torv's performance as Agent Olivia Dunham. The following year, Fringe was again nominated in the same categories, as well as Leonard Nimoy for his guest work as Dr. William Bell. However, this time Fringe received accolades for Best Actress and Best Guest Star on Television.

Writers Guild of America Awards

The Writers Guild of America Awards are presented annually by the Writers Guild of America. Fringe has been nominated for two awards. 

 J.J. Abrams, Jason Cahill, Julia Cho, David H. Goodman, Felicia Henderson, Brad Caleb Kane, Alex Kurtzman, Darin Morgan, J. R. Orci, Roberto Orci, Jeff Pinkner, and Zack Whedon.

Other awards
Fringe has claimed massive success achievement in award categories praising the series as a whole, and has also laid claim to numerous acting accolades. Fringe has had success in being nominated for various visual effects and cinematography awards. Fringe's official website's content as well as the website itself, have garnered numerous honors. "Pilot" is the most nominated episode of the series for visual effects and cinematography.

References 
General
 

Specific

Fringe (TV series)
Fringe